Ivan Dejmal (October 17, 1946 in Ústí nad Labem – February 6, 2008 in Prague) was a Czech politician and environmentalist.

Biography 

Ivan Dejmal studied at the Czech University of Life Sciences Prague in Prague from 1965 to 1970, but he was expelled following his arrest for activity in the students’ movement. He spent four years in prison on charges of "subversive activity against the Republic" (1970–1972 and 1974–1976).

He became a signatory to Charter 77 early in 1977 and soon became the head of its environmental commission, despite limited education in ecology. In 1987, Dejmal started to issue the samizdat journal Ecological Bulletin (Ekologický bulletin). In 1988, Dejmal founded the first independent ecological organization in Czechoslovakia the Ecological Society (Ekologická společnost). In December 1989, Dejmal participated in the foundation of the Confederation of Political Prisoners. 

In 1989, he was an active member of the Civic Forum, he headed the ecological section. From February 1991 to July 1992, he was Czech Minister of the Environment. 

Dejmal was supporter of several environmental NGOs - an active member of Společnost pro trvale udržitelný život (Society for Sustainable Living), a member of Honorary board of Děti Země (Children of the Earth), etc.

1946 births
2008 deaths
Politicians from Ústí nad Labem
Czechoslovak politicians
Charter 77 signatories
Environment ministers of the Czech Republic
Czechoslovak democracy activists
Czechoslovak prisoners and detainees
Prisoners and detainees of Czechoslovakia
People of the Velvet Revolution
Czech environmentalists
Christian Democratic Party (Czech Republic) politicians
Civic Democratic Alliance politicians